Electroshock is the fifth studio album by Belgian singer Kate Ryan released on 25 June 2012.

After Alive, is the first album that does not include any cover version and, also, is entirely in English, except for the version of "Little Braveheart" featured on the album, which has French lyrics sung by Ryan.

Track listing 

(^) denotes additional production

Sample credit
 "LoveLife" is based on a riff of the song "Narcotic", written by Wolfgang Schrödl and performed by Liquido.
 "Robots" is based on a riff of the song "Living on Video", written by Pascal Languirand and performed by Trans-X.

Charts

References 

2012 albums
Kate Ryan albums